The Computer Originated World (COW) was the method of creating the BBC1 symbol that was used between 18 February 1985 and 16 February 1991. It was later used by the international, commercial television service BBC World Service Television from its launch until 26 January 1995.

BBC1

Launch
The Computer Originated World replaced the previous Noddy globe symbols at 7 pm on 18 February 1985. Unusually, the new look was unveiled whilst the channel was still on the air rather than waiting for the following morning to launch it. The globe was created by the BBC graphics and BBC computer departments and work began in 1983. The need to replace the Noddy globes came about as the globes were the only mechanically produced idents around on national television, as more and more television companies started to use computer graphics, made popular by the launch of Channel 4. The COW was originally planned to launch on 1 January 1985, but Michael Grade, then controller of BBC1, delayed the launch to coincide with a larger schedule change that accompanied the launch of the soap opera EastEnders, and updated and renewed weather graphics. This launch was hoped to reinvent BBC1 following ratings slide and ever increasing competition from their commercial rivals at ITV.

The globe itself launched at 7 pm on 18 February, introducing one of the new flagship programmes: Wogan, a chat show hosted by Terry Wogan and featuring a variety of guests. The old Noddy globe had been used throughout the day until the 7 pm launch.

Components of look
The Computer Originated World itself is a semi-transparent blue globe with golden continents and gold "BBC1" legend located below the globe in a font similar to that used in the early days of the BBC. The globe revolved at a steady pace throughout, and had the effect of a spotlight added to the surface. The continents were placed in such a way that the continents appeared to float on the water. The caption had the option of displaying the legend 'Ceefax 170' and later 'Ceefax 888' in reference to the subtitles available with the programme. Regional variations also included a legend with the region name, also in gold, below the BBC1 legend. The globe was generated when needed by the computer programme located in a metal box. This box had switches on the front that could turn the BBC1 caption, regional caption and subtitles caption on and off, as these elements were added later. These generators were delivered to all 11 regions and installed before Christmas 1984. Originally it was planned to be launched on 1 January 1985, but the launch was deferred to coincide with radical changes to the BBC1 schedule.

The look also featured an altered clock face to that used previously. This clock was once again electronic, but was changed to a black background, blue counters and gold hands to match the ident. The updated BBC1 legend also featured below the clock. The nations of Scotland, Wales and Northern Ireland, as well as BBC Midlands, did receive their own variations of the clock, however it is not believed that any other English regions received their own variations. The network BBC One clock did not have a centre dot; this was never rectified throughout the run of the clock due to an oversight, however the dot was present on regional variations.

The new look also marked a change in programme slide design. These new slides featured the BBC1 legend upright and sideways in a black sidebar to the left of the screen. The remainder of the screen featured a picture of the programme and the programme name located at the bottom. However, the programme slides were still optically developed. This was changed in September 1988 when the introduction of Quantel Paintbox allowed captions to be created digitally. The design was altered slightly with the BBC1 legend made more textured, slightly smaller and moved to the bottom of the screen. The font was also changed to Optima, with text remaining in the same position. All this would now be located over the image rather than separate from it.

Promotions were not uniform, but were based on a seasonal scheme before being replaced. The promotions usually didn't contain any channel branding but would occasionally feature parts of the BBC1 legend in the design.

Christmas idents 

During Christmas times, the '1' and the globe was altered into a variety of guises. One was made for each year the ident was in existence, None were used by BBC Scotland, instead using their own idents.

Regional Idents

Technical details

Hardware

The COW was generated by a black box containing several circuit boards. Each board carried one layer of the animation - the BBC1 logo, blue background etc., with switches to input various captions when needed. Their output had an aspect ratio of 5:4 and was cropped for transmission to 4:3. It first appeared at 7 p.m. on Monday 18 February. 
The digital standard used is that specified by the EBU for a digital parallel interface. While the device has only analogue outputs, to suit present installations, the EBU specification defines the required sampling rates and levels for luminance and chrominance. A further advantage is that the Quantel Paintbox handles data in a form quite close, but not identical, to this format.

To produce the overall effect two full frame-stores are used. One is the foreground store which holds the highlighted gold shell, and the other is the background store for the shaded blue disc and the captions. These stores hold only a single frame, and there is no restriction on their content. They are full colour and can display any picture produced by the Quantel Paintbox. These stores are generally known as the 'fixed' memory.

The memory structure is similar to that used for the recently introduced digital Test Card F generator, but each card can hold more data, and can be a part of a larger data-base. The EPROMs used are 27128 16 kbyte devices, although the memory card can take 27256 and even 27512 devices as, and when, they become available. When fully populated with 27128s each card holds 0.5 Mbytes. The EPROMs in question contain 20 000 pixels of map data pre-rendered as frames of animation. Each card has on its side a yellow LED that lights up when that card is in use. 

The controller unit has a 24-bit sequence address bus giving access to 16 Mbytes, but the equipment has space for only 7.5 Mbytes, and is fitted for 5 Mbytes. The controller also addresses the fixed memory through a 19-bit address bus. This memory uses identical cards to the sequence memory and four are in parallel. A result of this is that the customising for each region affects only the data on two cards in the system. In fact, since only the caption is different for each, only 16 EPROMs are specialised.

The controller also decodes the sequence data from its highly compressed format into a usable 13.5 MHz data stream, and distributes timing information to the rest of the system. Timing control is useful, since it can eliminate the need for external synchronising. This equipment's output can be varied from over 6µs early to over 3µs late relative to the mixed syncs input reference. Digital multipliers are used to key the map onto the foreground and background data streams.  These are full 8 x 8 bit devices, and correct scaling is incorporated to ensure unity gain where necessary. The two keys are processed to prevent any excess amplitude after combining.

The two data streams are added digitally, before being blanked. Normally digital blanking needs to be shaped to conform to PAL system I, but since all the signals are generated internally, correct shaping is naturally included within the data. (In any case the start and end of all lines are black.)

A new, triple-video, analogue-to- digital converter has been designed to provide the YUV outputs and an analogue matrix used for two sets of RGB outputs. Both these units employ close tolerance components to minimise drift, and hence regular alignment. A test waveform is included within the system for checking output levels and matrix accuracy.

The system also includes a large power supplier, based on a commercial unit, and a BBC designed clock generator which is common with other digital equipments.

The main store of the system is known as the 'sequence' memory. This holds the data for the map of the world for each of the 600 fields that are displayed. This data is compressed by a coding system which combines the benefits of traditional run-length coding, with the advantages of pixel definitions. There is physical space for up to 7.5 Mbytes of memory, although the addressing can access up to 16 Mbytes. For this application a field of data is stored in less than 8 kbytes of memory space, as opposed to over 400 kbytes for a full field store.

To the right of these cards are five unused slots and to the right of those is a card with a red handle, which is the processor card. The player can be made to display variants of images by changing some switch settings on the processor card.

Software

The starting point for the sequence data was a purchased data-base of a Mercator's projection map of the world. This was edited by Computer Graphics to remove all political boundaries, and transferred from their VAX-11 computer into the Quantel Paintbox. This was used for a 2:1 size reduction which incorporated the anti-aliasing algorithms. The data was then transferred back to the VAX for encoding into the Designs Department data compression format.

The two sets of fixed data, the gold shell for the foreground and the blue disc with caption for the background, were 'drawn' on the Paintbox. This data is properly anti-aliased at source and was also transferred to their VAX-11. Further processing ensures that no degradation occurs.

Both the fixed and sequence data was transferred from Computer Graphics to Design Department on magnetic tape, using the internal post. This proved to be an extremely efficient method of data interchange, far exceeding the earlier methods of paper tape and floppy disks.

BBC World Service Television

Components of look

Upon the launch of BBC World Service Television on 11 March 1991 to replace BBC TV Europe, the channel reused the COW symbol. Technically, the globe itself remained the same with changes made only to presentational style and the caption below the globe and the whole look being brought into line with corporate branding at the time.

The ident itself was modified with the caption beneath showing a BBC corporate logo, with the slanted legend 'World Service Television' beneath, in the same style as used for regional variations of the BBC1 ident at the time. No clock accompanied the look, due to the various time zones used around the world, with serious or news programming being introduced by the globe.

Presentational style mirrored by that used on BBC1 and 2 at the time, and featured a static globe, positioned with Britain, Europe and Africa in view, with BBC logo beneath located in the top left corner of the screen. The logo was present throughout the presentation. Static captions also featured this globe symbol in the top left corner, located in a sidebar of generic lines, with programme title overlaid the image at the bottom of the screen. The station was also unusual, in the fact that it had a static, opaque permanent digital on-screen graphic (DOG) of the BBC logo in the top right corner of the screen.

The look appears to have been dropped on 26 January 1995.

Replacement
The look on BBC World Service Television was dropped in favour of a look consisting entirely of real and simulated flags on the screen, with a single large BBC logo in centre screen. This was to emphasise the role that news played on the channel, and to associate itself more closely as a news channel, rather than BBC1. This is primarily evident, as the look was reused for that purpose upon the channel's split into BBC World, as well as the original BBC Arabic Television.

See also

 Noddy (camera)
 BBC One "Virtual Globe" ident
 BBC World Service Television

References

External links 
 A full, technical account of how the COW was brought to life
 BBC One 'COW Globe' Ident at TV Ark
 An extremely technical account of how the COW worked, BBC Engineering
 YouTube video featuring the World Service TV variation
 YouTube video featuring WSTV continuity

BBC One
BBC Idents
Television presentation in the United Kingdom
1985 establishments in the United Kingdom
1985 in British television
Symbols introduced in 1985
British inventions